Herbert Beukes (born c. 1942) is a South African journalist and diplomat. He served as the South African Ambassador to the United States.

References

1940s births
South African journalists
South African diplomats
Living people